Narong Kittikachorn (birth 21 October 1933) is the son of Field Marshal Thanom Kittikachorn, former Prime Minister. former military commander former Commander in Chief and former Minister of Defense and the son-in-law of Field Marshal Praphas Charusathien, former army commander, former Chief of Police And former Minister of the Interior.

Personal life 
Narong was born on 21 October 1933, the son of Thanom Kittikachorn and Jongkol Kittikachorn. and is the son-in-law of Field Marshal Praphas Charusathien, due to marrying Mrs. Supaporn Kittikachorn, the third daughter of Field Marshal Praphas and Sawai Jarusathien, have a total of 4 children.

Education 
Narong graduated from Suankularb Wittayalai School, then study at Chulachomklao Royal Military Academy, class 5 and the Royal Military Academy Sandhurst.

Government service 
Narong Kittikachorn has served as assistant secretary-general of the coup junta (Coup in Thailand 1971) when the coup was finished hold a position Deputy Secretary-General, Commission on Inspecting and Monitoring of Official performance and is the commander of the 2nd Battalion, 11th Infantry Regiment, The King's Guard.

After the 1973 Thai popular uprising, Narong left Thailand with Thanom and Praphas before traveling back to Thailand at a later time.

Politics 
After the political situation calmed down Narong returned to Thailand and became a member of the Thai Nation Party and was elected as the Phra Nakhon Si Ayutthaya Province MP in 1983. Later, Narong resigned from the Thai Nation Party and was a member of the Liberal Party and accepted the position of party leader and was elected as the 2nd Phra Nakhon Si Ayutthaya MP in 1986 and the 3rd term in 1988. The 3rd period is still under the Liberal Party before resigning from the Liberal Party and laying a political hand in 1992.

Honours
received the following royal decorations in the Honours System of Thailand:
 1989 -  Knight Grand Cross of the Most Exalted Order of the White Elephant
 1987 -  Knight Grand Cross of the Most Noble Order of the Crown of Thailand
 1962 -  Companion of the Most Illustrious Order of Chula Chom Klao
 1961 -  Victory Medal - Korean War
 1969 -  Victory Medal - Vietnam War, with flames
  -  Freemen Safeguarding Medal (Second Class, First Category)
  -  Chakra Mala Medal
  -  Red Cross Medal of Merit

See also 
 Liberal Party (Thailand)
 1973 Thai popular uprising
 Thammasat University massacre

References 

1933 births
Living people
Narong Kittikachorn
Narong Kittikachorn